Caecilia isthmica is a species of caecilian in the family Caeciliidae. It is found in Colombia and Panama. Its natural habitats are subtropical or tropical moist lowland forests, subtropical or tropical moist montane forests, plantations, rural gardens, and heavily degraded former forest.

References

isthmica
Amphibians of Colombia
Amphibians of Panama
Amphibians described in 1877
Taxonomy articles created by Polbot